Péter Szilágyi may refer to:
 Péter Szilágyi (footballer) (born 1988), Hungarian football player
Péter Szilágyi (painter) (born 1953), Hungarian painter and artist
 Péter Szilágyi (conductor) (1954–2013), Hungarian music conductor and politician
 Péter Szilágyi (politician, 1981) (born 1981), Hungarian jurist and politician